I Am Canadian was the slogan of Molson Canadian beer from 1994 until 1999 (via ad agencies Maclaren Lintas, then MacLaren McCann), and between 2000 and 2005 (by Bensimon Byrne).  It was also the subject of a popular ad campaign centred on Canadian nationalism, the most famous examples of which are "The Rant" and "The Anthem".  The ads aired in both English Canada and the United States. In 2005, shortly after Molson's merger with American brewer Coors, it announced it was retiring the "I Am Canadian" campaign.<ref>Robert M. Seiler, "Selling Patriotism/Selling Beer: The  case of the 'I AM CANADIAN!'  Commercial," American Review of Canadian Studies (spring 2002) v32#1 pp 45-66 online </ref> In 2017, Molson's "red beer fridge" ad, created as part of its "I Am Canadian" campaign, had a resurgence in social media as a result of the United States' immigration and refugee ban. 

 "The Rant" 
In March 2000, using nationalism as a platform, the ad starred a man named Joe: an average Canadian, standing in a movie theatre, with a cinema screen behind him showing different images relating to Canadian culture. Joe proceeds to give a speech about what is it to be a Canadian and what it is not to be a Canadian, making particular efforts to distinguish himself both from common Canadian stereotypes of Americans ("I believe in peacekeeping, not policing") and common American stereotypes of Canadians ("I don't live in an igloo," "I say 'about,' not 'aboot'").

It was performed by Nova Scotian/Canadian actor Jeff Douglas and directed by an American, Kevin Donovan, but written by a Canadian, Glen Hunt. The commercial won local, national and international success. 

The ad was tested live in front of movie goers in theatres in Ottawa and deemed successfully enough to run on-air.
 
It was the work of the public relations agency Thornley Fallis together with Molson that helped garner local, national and International awards. Director, Kelly Swinney(Donovan),and team successfully won the Canadian Public Relations award, the national Gold Quill award & the prestigious International Public Relations award in 2001. 

In addition to the commercial “Joe Canada” as he was called did a cross rogue tour on Canada Day crossing the Nation in 26 hours and visiting Provinces to recite the rant. Beginning in Newfoundland and ending in Vancouver. 

In 2002, John Robert Colombo included the Rant in the Penguin Treasury of Popular Canadian Poems and Songs. Colombo acknowledged that it was unusual to include the text of a beer commercial in a poetry collection, but emphasized that "the open-minded reader will respond to the power of the words that express a human need to affirm an identity in the face of ignorance and indifference," and compared it to the works of Christopher Smart, Ebenezer Elliot, and Vachel Lindsay.

 Parodies 
The popularity of "I Am Canadian" in Canada led to many parodies of the advertisement. Several radio stations have produced provincial variations on the theme. These include I am an Albertan, I am a British Columbian, I am a Newfoundlander, and I Am Not Canadian, the last of which focused on a Quebec sovereignist.

William Shatner performed his own variation on the idea in a Just for Laughs appearance. He announced to the world: "I am not a Starfleet commander, ...or T.J. Hooker." The rant continues, making fun of Trekkies and his own typecasting as James T. Kirk.

Weasel, the lead character of I Am Weasel, parodied the advertisement in a promotional ad for the series' home, Cartoon Network. The ad later aired on a similar Canadian outlet, Teletoon.

During the 2002 Swiss National Exposition, the Swiss National Bank pavilion featured an "Ich bin Schweizer" adaptation of the ad, using stereotypes held by Germans about the Swiss.

At the Juno Awards of 2022, actor and host Simu Liu opened the ceremony with an updated riff on the "I Am Canadian" ad, highlighting contemporary signifiers such as multicultural food, runaway housing prices and the legalization of marijuana.

 Trivia 
This commercial premiered during the Academy Awards, which, in that year, included Robin Williams singing the song "Blame Canada", a satirical song from the movie South Park: Bigger, Longer & Uncut.''

"The Anthem" 
This ad features famous moments from Canadian history (including the pounding of the Last Spike and the raising of the Maple Leaf flag), as well as a variety of average Canadians (including William Shatner), singing a song extolling the virtues of Canada and its citizens.

See also 

 Canadian beer

References

External links 
 "The Rant" (YouTube)
 "The Anthem" (YouTube)

Canadian advertising slogans
1994 neologisms
Advertising campaigns
Beer advertising
Canadian television commercials
Canadian identity
Molson Coors Beverage Company